Georgy Vasilyevich Ivanov (25 May 1901 – 25 December 2001) was a Soviet Army major general and Hero of the Soviet Union. Ivanov was awarded the title Hero of the Soviet Union and the Order of Lenin for his leadership of the 6th Guards Rifle Division from late 1944 to 1945. Ivanov fought in World War II at the Battle of the Dnieper and the Vistula–Oder Offensive.

Early life 
Georgy Vasilyevich Ivanov was born on 25 May 1901 in Upornikov in the Khopyorsky Okrug of the Don Host Oblast to a peasant family. In 1911, Ivanov's father died of his war wounds from the Russo-Japanese War. Ivanov graduated from primary school. In 1919, Ivanov joined the Red Army. He served in the Russian Civil War on the Don River as a private in the 5th Amur Cossack Cavalry Regiment of the 1st Cavalry Army. After the regiment was withdrawn to the reserve, Ivanov fell ill with typhus and spent two months in the hospital. After recovering, he returned to the front and fought battles near Novocherkassk.

Interwar 
After completing the 10th Novocherkassk Cavalry Command Course between July 1921 and September 1922, Ivanov was posted to the 19th Manych Cavalry Regiment of the 4th Cavalry Division in February 1923, stationed in the North Caucasus Military District. There he served as an assistant platoon commander, starshina of the 1st Squadron, and as an acting platoon commander. Transferred to the 20th Salsk Cavalry Regiment of the division in November, Ivanov served with the latter as an acting platoon commander and starshina of the 2nd Squadron. Sent to study at the Kiev Combined Military School in September 1924, he returned to the 4th Division, now relocated to the Leningrad Military District, to serve a platoon commander in its 21st Don-Stavropol Cavalry Regiment following his graduation in August 1926. In 1927, he joined the Communist Party of the Soviet Union. After completing the courses of physical education at the Leningrad Military-Pedagogical School between November 1928 and August 1929, Ivanov returned to his previous position with the 21st Regiment, briefly serving as an acting squadron commander.

Placed at the disposal of the 4th Directorate of the Staff of the Red Army in December 1929, Ivanov was sent to Mongolia as an advisor to the 3rd Cavalry Regiment of the 17th Cavalry Division of the Mongolian People's Army. Upon his return to the Soviet Union in December 1932, he became a student of the command department of the Military Academy of Mechanization and Motorization. By now a major, Ivanov was appointed commander of the 7th Mechanized Regiment of the 7th Cavalry Division following his graduation from the academy in December 1937. In 1940, he graduated from the Military Academy of the General Staff. After graduation, Ivanov became an officer in the Belorussian Direction of the General Staff.

World War II 
On 22 June, the German invasion of the Soviet Union, Operation Barbarossa, began. By 27 June, the Red Army General Staff had almost no reliable information from the Belorussian Special Military District. To clarify the situation, Ivanov flew in an Ilyushin Il-4 escorted by two fighters to meet with front commander Dmitry Pavlov. After flying over two German tank columns, Ivanov's aircraft landed at the headquarters of the 3rd Long-range Bomber Aviation Corps. On 29 July, his aircraft took off in another attempt to find Pavlov's headquarters but was shot down. Ivanov and the crew received shrapnel wounds, and he was evacuated to Moscow for treatment. After leaving the hospital, he taught at the Frunze Military Academy and participated in the defence of Moscow, helping to erect fortifications near Poklonnaya Hill during September. He was evacuated along with the academy to Central Asia. In March 1942, Ivanov became the chief of staff of the 24th Rifle Corps, part of the 60th Army. He fought in the Battle of the Dnieper during September 1943. For his actions during the battle, Ivanov was awarded the Order of the Red Banner on 20 September. He then fought in the Battle of Kiev.

In January 1944, Ivanov became the chief of staff of the 27th Rifle Corps, part of the 13th Army. On 10 January, he was awarded the Order of Suvorov 2nd class. On 2 September, he was awarded the Order of the Red Banner. Ivanov was promoted to command of the 6th Guards Rifle Division on 3 September. Ivanov led the division during the Vistula–Oder Offensive. On 26 January 1945, the division crossed the Oder near Steinau an der Oder and seized a bridgehead on its left bank. Within three days, the division reportedly repulsed all German counterattacks and expanded the bridgehead, reportedly inflicting heavy losses on German troops. Ivanov was awarded the title Hero of the Soviet Union and the Order of Lenin on 6 April for his leadership in the Vistula-Oder Offensive. The division then fought in the Berlin Offensive, capturing Zahna on 22 April. The division was then transferred to fight in the Prague Offensive. Ivanov ended the war in Prague. He was awarded the Order of Kutuzov 2nd class on 25 May. On 27 June, he was promoted to major general. In the Moscow Victory Parade of 1945, Ivanov commanded a battalion.

Postwar 
Postwar, Ivanov continued to command the 6th Guards Rifle Division, which was converted into the 15th Guards Mechanized Division within a year of the end of the war and withdrawn to the Belorussian Military District. Transferred to serve as a senior lecturer at the Voroshilov Higher Military Academy in April 1949, Ivanov transferred to the reserve on 26 January 1950. He lived in Moscow. He was awarded the Order of the Patriotic War 1st class on 6 April 1985 on the 40th anniversary of the end of World War II. On 4 May 1995, he was awarded the Order of Zhukov. Ivanov was awarded the Order of Honour on 19 February 2001 for his work on the "social protection of veterans and military-patriotic education of children". He died on 24 December 2001 and was buried in Troyekurovskoye Cemetery.

Personal life 
Ivanov married Nina Trifonovna, a medical worker. He had a son, Viktor Ivanov, who became a Soviet Army colonel.

Awards
Soviet Union

Russia

Foreign

References

Citations

Bibliography 

 

1901 births
2001 deaths
Russian centenarians
Men centenarians
Soviet major generals
Soviet military personnel of World War II
People from Nekhayevsky District
Burials in Troyekurovskoye Cemetery
Communist Party of the Soviet Union members
Academic staff of the Frunze Military Academy
Heroes of the Soviet Union
Recipients of the Order of Zhukov
Recipients of the Order of Honour (Russia)
Recipients of the Order of Lenin
Recipients of the Order of the Red Banner
Recipients of the Order of Suvorov, 2nd class
Recipients of the Order of Kutuzov, 2nd class
Officers of the Legion of Merit
Recipients of the Czechoslovak War Cross
Commanders of the Virtuti Militari
Recipients of the Order of the Cross of Grunwald, 3rd class
Recipients of the Patriotic Order of Merit
Soviet military personnel of the Russian Civil War
Military Academy of the General Staff of the Armed Forces of the Soviet Union alumni
Recipients of the Patriotic Order of Merit in silver
Recipients of the Order of Merit (Ukraine), 1st class
Foreign recipients of the Legion of Merit